The Silver Skates, aka City of Ice (Portuguese: Cidade de Gelo) is a 2020 Russian epic period romantic adventure film directed by Michael Lockshin in his feature directorial debut, with a screenplay written by Roman Kantor, and produced by Petr Anurov. The film is based on the American novel Hans Brinker, or The Silver Skates by Mary Mapes Dodge.

The story is set in the late 19th century in Saint Petersburg, capital of the Russian Empire. The city's ice-covered rivers and canals act as broad avenues, traversed on ice-skates and sleds, with markets and winter festivals on the ice. Social classes mix in this winter wonderland, and the courier Matvey crosses paths with the aristocrat Alisa is an intellectual girl, close to a noble family.
The film stars Fedor Fedotov and Sofya Priss, alongside Kirill Zaytsev, Yuri Borisov, Aleksei Guskov, Severija Janusauskaite, Yuri Kolokolnikov, Timofey Tribuntsev, and Alexandra Revenko in supporting roles. 
Principal photography lasted from January to May 2019.

The Silver Skates was chosen as the opening film of the 42nd Moscow International Film Festival, where it premiered on October 1, 2020. A limited theatrical release (due to the covid pandemic) was scheduled for December 10, 2020. The film was also shown in IMAX cinemas.
The film collected more than 100 million rubles for the highest-grossing opening weekend of its film screening and brought the total amount of 490.1 million rubles to the show times, despite the covid epidemic quarantine in Russia, compared to a production budget of 500 million rubles.

The rights to the film were acquired by Netflix on June 16, 2021. The Silver Skates is the first Russian film to be released on the platform in the Netflix Originals category.

Plot 

On Christmas Eve, 1899, Imperial Saint Petersburg's frozen rivers and canals transform the capital city into a fairytale-like wonderland, with bustling festivities on the ice. 

Pure-hearted 18-year-old Matvey Polyakov is an ice-skating courier of a local bakery, renowned for his speed. He is the fastest thanks to the special silver skates inherited from his father, a lamplighter.

The tsarist minister Nikolai Vyazemsky's daughter Alisa Vyazemskaya is interested in chemistry and the world of science, but is forced to hide her hobbies from her father, who, like many Russian aristocrats of that time, believes that a woman doesn’t need a higher education at all.

A few days before the dawn of the 20th century, Matvey loses his job as a deliveryman, because he could not deliver the order on time, as the street enroute was blocked for the Vyazemskys driving along it. At the same time, he discovers that his father has consumption. At the hospital the doctor tells Matvey that there is a chance of a costly cure for his father in Germany.

By chance, Matvey meets a group of pickpockets led by "Alex" named the Ice Gang, all of whom are fascinated by Marx's ideas about expropriation. Although struggling financially and unable to afford his father's treatment, Matvey trains with the Ice Gang to learn how to pickpocket in order to pay for his father's treatment. The gang challenges Matvey to steal into the Vyazemsky mansion.
Matvey climbs onto Alisa's balcony where they accidentally stumble upon each other. 

After some time, Matvey steals two invitations to a ball on ice in the courtyard of the Saint Michael's Castle, where he goes with Alex, posing as aristocrats. 
Alisa, as an aristocrat, is also there; she is introduced at the ball to the captain of the guard, Count Arkady Trubetskoy, her betrothed. Alisa and Matvey meet again and make a deal: Alisa won't reveal Matvey's disguise, but he must give permission for Alisa to enter the Bestuzhev Courses as a student: according to the law of the time, this requires the consent of a male companion or her father. Although Dmitri Mendeleev himself endorses Alisa's candidacy at the entrance exam, the idea fails, because the consent must be submitted in writing, and Matvey cannot write.

Matvey's father rejects the money because of the dishonest way his son got it. Matvey quarrels with him and goes to live with Alex, who, together with his gang for the winter, huddles in the wreck of an old ship frozen into the ice on the coast of the Gulf of Finland. 

On Christmas, Matvey, using the fact that Alisa's parents are at the ball, persuades her to go on a date with him. The two of them skate along the canals and finally realize that they are in love with each other. 
The next day, Alex's gang at the fair is attacked by a specially trained squad of guards led by the Count, as the Ice Gang's actions have long attracted the attention of the city authorities.
One guard manages to grab one of its members, while Matvey begins to pursue the Count, but Alex comes to his aid, who shoots the Count's leg with a pistol. Matvey decides to return home, where he finds his father has died. 

On the same evening, Alisa appears at the performance of the French magician Fourier, who performs a trick with flames and tells the audience that the flames come from the "energy between Arkady and Alisa". Alisa considers this a stupid farce and explains Fourier's trick to the public. Her enraged father searches her room, and finds her scientific books. They are burned, and Alisa's governess, the prim Englishwoman Miss Jackson, is fired. Miss Jackson decides that Alisa has inspired her to choose what she truly wants in life and not what other wants, and encourages Alisa to make those decisions as well even if they are difficult.
 
Alisa runs away from home to try to escape to Paris, where she can study chemistry freely. She finds Matvey on the ship and asks him to come with her. But then, the ship is surrounded by the Prince and his soldiers, and a confrontation between them the Ice Gang, whose members have been captured by the Prince, begins. Alex sacrifices his life to save Matvey, who nearly dies of hypothermia before being taken to a hospital. 

New Year is coming. Alisa, who was returned home, is mentally broken. She learns that her father gave full consent to her marriage with Prince Arkady Trubetskoy. 
On the occasion of the New Year, Nikolai brings her to a masquerade ball at the Great Gatchina Palace. Unexpectedly, she meets Matvey in disguise, and they decide to finally escape to Paris together, using the two tickets Matvey acquired. But Matvey dropped one of the tickets, and the Prince, finding the ticket, realizes their plan and chases after them.
At the Vitebsky railway station, discovering the missing ticket, Matvey persuades Alisa to get on the train, and he himself runs to the ticket offices to buy a new one, but then the Prince appears on the platform with the missing ticket. 
In the ensuing fight, Matvey manages to take away the ticket and he manages to jump onto the train, but Arkady manages to finally shoot him. The bullet hits the silver skates instead, and Matvey and Alisa  make it to Paris.

Four years later, Nikolai Vyazemsky comes to Dmitri Mendeleev and tells him he knows that he is in secret correspondence with his daughter. The proud Mendeleev tells him that Alisa has made great strides in the study of chemistry and in a year will receive an academic degree, which will allow her to work in all prestigious universities in the West. 
Realizing that this is the only way to return his daughter to her homeland, Vyazemsky asks the directorate of the university, where the Bestuzhev Courses are held, to amend the charter, thanks to which from now on women will be able to head the department. 
A year later, he watches Alisa teach a chemistry lesson in a class. The film ends with a scene in which Alisa, Matvey and their little son Petya, named after his late paternal grandfather, are ice skating together.

Cast 
 Fedor Fedotov as Matvey Polyakov
Matvey is a poor lamplighter's son, his only treasure an inherited silver-plated skates. Matvey dreams of winning Alisa's heart, the two star-crossed due to their differing social statuses. He introduces her to his world, where you can just be happy without any conventions. When simple courtship is no longer enough, he enters into a struggle for his beloved with a court careerist.
 Sonya Priss as Alisa Vyazemskaya (English: Alice Maria Augusta von Schlesenberg-Vyazemskaya)
Alisa, a major dignitary's daughter, deeply interested in science. She learns that she is going to marry Prince Arkady Trubetskoy. When she becomes acquainted with Matvey, a simple  lamplighter's son, Alisa re-evaluates her own life and decides on the impossible, it seemed, for a representative of high society - hand in hand with a lover - a commoner to fulfill a cherished desire.
 Kirill Zaytsev as Captain Count Arkady Trubetskoy, an officer of the Guard Department (also tr. Arkadiy)
 Yuri Borisov as Alexey Tarasov, the leader of the pickpocket by Alex gang, the ice skating thieves.
Alex is a marxist who justifies his crimes by the fact that he steals from the rich, thus expropriating what was expropriated from the poor.
 Aleksei Guskov as Minister Nikolai Nikolaevich Vyazemsky in the government of the Russian Empire, and Alisa Vyazemskaya's father.
 Severija Janusauskaite as Severina Genrikhovna, Alisa's stepmother
 Yuri Kolokolnikov as Grand prince
 Timofey Tribuntsev as Pyotr Polyakov (English: Petr), a lamplighter, Matvey Polyakov's father
 Alexandra Revenko as Margo, Alex's girlfriend and the ice gang leaders.
 Vasily Kopeikin as a member of the Mukha gang (English: Muha), a man ice skating.
 Mikhail Shelomentsev as a member of the Graf, a pickpocket on skates.
 Bato Shoinjonov as Genghis, a member of the Yakut, a pickpocket on skates.
 Sergey Koltakov as Dmitri Mendeleev, a scientist
 Cathy Belton as Miss Jackson, Alisa's governess
 Margarita Adaeva as Praskovia, Alisa's maid
 Denis Lavant as Fourier, an illusionist
 Dmitry Lysenkov as a doctor
 Valery Kukhareshin as a senior chef at Le Grand Pie
 Sergey Barkovsky as a principal of the Bestuzhev Courses
 Elena Rufanova as Princess Trubetskaya, mother of Prince Arkady Trubetskoy
 Vasily Shchipitsyn as a policeman at the crossroads from the Saint Petersburg Police

Production

Development 
The source of inspiration for producer Petr Anurov may have been the title of the book of the famous novel of the same name by the Dutch-American writer Mary Mapes Dodge. While the book and the movie share a name and include silver skates and a sick father, they tell completely unrelated stories. 

The film was the feature debut of director Michael Lockshin, who had previously directed shorts and commercials.

Casting 
Relatively unknown actors were cast in the main roles; the project was the first major film work for Fedotov and Priss, who are both from Saint Petersburg.

The actors had to go through sports training for the figure skating demands of the roles. Fedotov had been playing ice hockey from the age of three, but had to learn the different skating style during three months of intensive training. Almost all the stunts in the film were performed by Fedotov. The film also involved understudies (professional skaters) and stuntmen.

The company on the screen are the masters and actor of the star: Aleksei Guskov, Yuri Kolokolnikov, Severija Janusauskaite, Kirill Zaytsev, Yuri Borisov, Alexandra Revenko, Timofey Tribuntsev, Sergey Koltakov, and also stars of European cinema Denis Lavant and Cathy Belton.

Filming 

Vast amounts of scenery were created for the film, taken from a  warehouse and installed on special structures on the Great Neva by emergency response personnel.

Skates based on historical models were custom made for the film, as well as carriages, sleighs and cars of the period. Jewelry used in the film was rented from Garrard & Co and kept under guard.

Principal photography was undertaken from January to May 2019. Locations in Saint Petersburg include the Peter and Paul Fortress, the Grand prince with a passage of the Saint Michael's Castle, Vitebsky railway station, and the Stieglitz Museum of Applied Arts. Scenes were also shot in Leningrad Oblast, such as at Great Gatchina Palace in the town of Gatchina. Interior scenes were filmed in Yusupov Palace, Marble Palace, Sheremetev Palace (Fountain House), as well as in the Vladimir Palace (House of Scientists).

Most of the filming took place on the frozen rivers and canals of the bridges in Saint Petersburg, and comprise the largest collection of such footage. The film crew built and decorated ice fairs and skating rinks, and when the spring of 2019 began to come into its own, a large-scale decoration of the frozen Moyka River was built in the pavilion to shoot action scenes on ice.

Post-production 
The computer graphics for the project was be handled by Alexander Gorokhov's CGF visual effects studio. 

About 200 specialists took part in the work on visual effects.  specialists filmed and scanned the center of St. Petersburg with a special camera so that in the scenes filmed in the pavilion against the background of a chroma key, real architectural objects could be built in post-production.

Controversy
The film was called "scandalous" by journalists because of the initiation of a case by Rosprirodnadzor (Federal Service for Supervision of Natural Resources). The residents of St. Petersburg were initially surprised to see how public utilities cleared snow from the ice at the Moyka River, Kryukov Canal and Griboyedov Canal were covered with blue wooden slabs and film studio agents appeared nearby.
The paint from these slabs allegedly penetrated the ice and then polluted the water.

Music

The original film soundtrack was composed by Guy Farley and recorded by the London Symphony Orchestra at Abbey Road Studios, is composed of 24 numbers, 2 of which directly quote the famous piano piece Moonlight by Claude Debussy, arranged for orchestra. 

The film also uses fragments of works by Johann Sebastian Bach's Fugue g-moll BWV 578, 
String Quartet No. 3 (Part III) and String Quartet No. 51 op. 64 No. 4 (Part I) by Joseph Haydn,
Nocturne No. 13 H 60 by John Field,
Piano Sonata No. 2 WWV 21 (Part II) by Richard Wagner,
The Skaters' Waltz by Emil Waldteifel. 

The Final Waltz from the ballet The Nutcracker by Pyotr Tchaikovsky, Scene with dances from the Prologue of the ballet The Sleeping Beauty. 
The waltz - Tales from the Vienna Woods and Roses from the South by Johann Strauss the Son.
Russian Easter Festival Overture, Op. 36; The dance of buffoons from the opera The Snow Maiden by Nikolai Rimsky-Korsakov.

Track listing

Release

Marketing 
The first teaser trailer of The Silver Skates was released on June 19, 2019. The second trailer was released on October 10, 2019.

Theatrical 
The film was initially scheduled to be released in early February 2020. After being postponed by six months, The Silver Skates premiered as the opening film of the 42nd Moscow International Film Festival in October 2020, where Nikita Mikhalkov is the president.

The Silver Skates had a special screening on December 3, 2020 at the Alexandrinsky Theatre in Saint Petersburg, and its world premiere was held on December 8, at the Karo 11 October cinema center in Moscow on New Arbat Avenue. 
It is scheduled to be theatrically released in the Russian Federation on December 10, 2020 by the Central Partnership, domestically representing the international distributor Paramount Pictures. 

The film has been converted for IMAX theatres using digital media re-mastering technology.

Reception

Critical response
The film received high marks in the Russian press; according to aggregators, there were no negative reviews at all. 
"The full-length debut of director Michael Lockshin was definitely a success," Valery Kichin writes in Russian Gazette. 
Many of the critics have highlighted the vintage aesthetics, the film's dreamlike atmosphere and music. Anton Dolin  in Meduza also noted the social subtext of the plot: "The central conflict of the Silver Skates - it seems for the first time in the domestic film mainstream - is associated with the liberation of the heroine from the bonds of patriarchy." 
Some authors have compared The Silver Skates to Titanic, noting plot parallels.

Western press reacted coldly to the film; currently Silver Skates holds a 33% on Rotten Tomatoes. John Serba of Decider called the film "bland" and "at best an empty, escapist, mostly guilty near-pleasure."

Accolades

See also
 List of Christmas films

References

External links 
 Official website 
 
 
 

2020 films
2020s Russian-language films
2020 adventure films
2020 fantasy films
2020 romantic drama films
2020s adventure drama films
2020s Christmas drama films
2020s fantasy adventure films
2020s historical drama films
2020s historical fantasy films
2020s romantic fantasy films
2020s teen drama films
2020s teen fantasy films
2020s teen romance films
Christmas adventure films
Children's Christmas films
Drama films based on actual events
Figure skating films
Film controversies
Films about interclass romance
Films about police officers
Films about royalty
Films based on multiple works
Films based on romance novels
Films based on Romeo and Juliet
Films based on Russian novels
Films based on works by American writers
Films postponed due to the COVID-19 pandemic
Films set in 1899
Films set in the 1900s
Films set in palaces
Films set in Saint Petersburg
Films set in the Russian Empire
Films shot in Saint Petersburg
IMAX films
Love stories
Political drama films
Romance films based on actual events
Romantic epic films
Epic films based on actual events
Russian adventure drama films
Russian children's adventure films
Russian Christmas films
Russian fantasy adventure films
Russian fantasy drama films
Russian historical adventure films
Russian historical drama films
Russian romantic drama films
Russian teen drama films
Russian epic films
Teen adventure films
Russian-language Netflix original films